The Bears for Lunch is the 18th album by Dayton, Ohio rock group Guided by Voices. The album is the third released by the band's classic lineup in 2012 and it debuted at #9 on Billboard'''s Top Heatseekers'' albums chart

Track listing

References

Guided by Voices albums
2012 albums
Self-released albums
Fire Records (UK) albums